Zarifa Ghafari (born 1994) is a former female mayor of Maidan Shahr, capital city of the Wardak Province, Afghanistan. Ghafari was one of the few Afghan female mayors, next to the first Afghanistan's mayor, Azra Jafari and Khadija Zahra Ahmadi, and was also the youngest to be appointed, at the age of 24. She is known for her efforts to advance women's rights in Afghanistan. Ghafari was chosen as an International Woman of Courage in 2020 by the US Secretary of State. She has survived three assassination attempts.

Life and career 
Zarifa Ghafari was born in 1994 in Kabul. She was the first born of eight children born to Abdul Wasi Ghafari, an Afghan Army colonel and commander in the Special Operations Corps. She was not allowed to be educated but she attended a clandestine school. Education was legalised in 2001. She had to again attend Halima Khazan High School in secret after her father was sent to work in Paktia. Her parents did not want her to attend because of a suicide attack on the school. She was hospitalised later when she was caught in the blast of a bomb that killed the provincial governor.

Her father was gunned down by the militants in front of his house in Kabul on November 5, 2020. Ghafari attended Panjab University, Chandigarh, India only because she had obtained a scholarship. Her parents had already refused her to go to Shaikh Zayed University because they did not want her to be living alone. Her degree was in economics and she could have lived in Chandigarh but she decided to return home.

Ghafari applied to be the mayor of Maidan Shahr and she was chosen ahead of other (male) candidates based on the results of tests. She was officially appointed as the mayor of Maidan Shahr in July 2018 by the incumbent President Ashraf Ghani. She also became the youngest mayor at the age of 24 in Afghanistan and few sources mistakenly claimed Ghafari as the first female mayor in Afghanistan. However, her term as mayor of Maiden Shahr had to be delayed for a period of nine months due to  protests and threats by local politicians about her age and gender. There have been other female mayors in Afghanistan, but in areas generally seen as more culturally tolerant. In a traditionally conservative province like Wardak where the Taliban have widespread support, she held a nearly untenable position. 

On her first day as mayor, she faced harassment from a group of men who mobbed her office and warned her to resign from the position. She also faced death threats from Taliban and ISIL after assuming her duties as mayor. Zarifa was sworn in as mayor of the Maidan Shahr in March 2019. However, for safety reasons, she resided in Kabul. Ghafari was able to introduce an anti-litter campaign in her town and she is a role model to other women. She survived several assassination attempts. After her father was killed by gunmen on November 5, 2020, she said, "It is the Taliban. They don’t want me in Maidan Shar. That is why they killed my dad." She also made a special request and appeal from the then US Secretary of State Mike Pompeo to safeguard the women's rights in Afghanistan following the uncertainties posed by the Taliban USA negotiations.

In 2020 Donald Trump's administration signed a deal with the Taliban. Ghafari notes that the Americans had destroyed whole villages in her country to remove a few Taliban, but with this deal she said they "sold my country".

In August 2021, with the Taliban advancing, Ghafari announced she wouldn't flee the country. On August 15, 2021, after the fall of Kabul to the Taliban, she said, "I'm sitting here waiting for them to come. There is no one to help me or my family. I'm just sitting with them and my husband. And they will come for people like me and kill me." Following the takeover of Afghanistan's government by the Taliban in mid-August 2021, she fled the country arriving in Istanbul, Turkey on Wednesday, August 18, along with her partner, Bashir Mohammadi, her mother and four brothers and three sisters. She stayed in Bonn or Düsseldorf for six months before she decided to leave Germany and return to her home country. She discussed this with her fiancée, with the authorities in Kabul, a Netflix film crew and her biographer and then she returned relying on her profile to keep her safe. Her first post on social media was a photo of her at her father's grave. She was only there for days but although she noticed the improvements in security she also saw that women rights were dramatically reduced and they were banned from public places like parks and fun fairs.

In November 2022 Netflix released a documentary about her and an interview with her was published by the Financial Times.

Awards
Ghafari was listed in 100 inspiring and influential women from around the world for 2019 by BBC. Zarifa was chosen as an International Woman of Courage in 2020 by the US Secretary of State.

See also
 Maryam Durani
 Fawzia Koofi
 Salima Mazari
Azra Jafari

References 

1992 births
Living people
Afghan businesspeople
Afghan women activists
University of the Punjab alumni
BBC 100 Women
Mayors of places in Afghanistan
Women mayors of places in Afghanistan
21st-century Afghan women politicians
21st-century Afghan politicians
People from Maidan Wardak Province
Recipients of the International Women of Courage Award